Mitchell School is a public school in Mitchell in the U.S. state of Oregon with an enrollment of about 70 students. The K–12 school is the only school in the Mitchell School District, which covers sections of Wheeler County, including Mitchell.

Mitchell School operates a boarding residence for up to 20 students in grades 9 through 12. The dormitory opened midway in the 1990s. In 2020 the dormitory had 12 students. These students come from all over the world as well as all over Oregon. During the 2013–2014 school year, they included students from Thailand, Hong Kong, Germany, Mexico and Spain.

Academics
In 2008, 100 percent of the school's seniors received their high school diploma. Of 2 students, 2 graduated and 0 dropped out.

Campus
The school closed its dormitory during the COVID-19 pandemic in Oregon with a scheduled reopening in August 2021.

References

Education in Wheeler County, Oregon
School districts in Oregon